Antoine Guisan is a Swiss ecologist.

Biography
Guisan obtained his master's degree from the University of Geneva in 1992 and from 1993 to 1996 worked on his Ph.D. at the same place. In 1997 he worked as postdoc at Stanford University in the Center for Conservation Biology department and then held the same position at the Conservatoire et Jardin Botaniques. From 1998 to 2001 he worked at the Swiss Center for Faunal Cartography and then became an assistant professor at the University of Lausanne specializing in plant biogeography and spatial ecology. As of 2007 he works as associate professor in the same place specializing in plant ecology. Currently he is a member of the International Association for Vegetation Science as well as Landscape Ecology and Swiss Botanical Society with the International Society for Ecological Modelling. He is also married and has three kids.

References

Living people
20th-century births
Swiss ecologists
University of Geneva alumni
Academic staff of the University of Lausanne
Stanford University faculty
Year of birth missing (living people)